Geomag (stylised as GEOMAG) is a magnetic construction toy. The original toy consisted of bars with a magnet on each end (neodymium alloy) attached by a magnetic plug (coated with polypropylene) and nickel-coated metal spheres. Magnetic forces hold the bars and spheres together, creating the possibility for many constructions. The Geomag was invented and patented by Claudio Vicentelli in May 1998. Production is currently undertaken by Geomagworld SA, in Novazzano, Switzerland. Product lines have expanded from the original model (now called Geomag PRO). To comply with restrictions placed on nickel content in toys by the 2009/48/EC law, Geomag has re-modeled the spheres with a bronze alloy coating to comply with the new regulations.

Invention
In May 1998, Claudio Vicentelli, experienced in technical applications of permanent magnets and the creator of a product deposited for the magnetic circuit, and the brand name "GEOMAG."

The patent defines the circuit created by the Geomag bars, each consisting of two magnets at the ends, connected by a metal pin and metallic spheres. The structure minimises the amount of magnetic material to reduce production costs.

In August of the same year, Plastwood S.r.l. was granted the license to market and manufacture the products worldwide.

Geomag worldwide 
Gemoag retailed in late 1999 throughout the Italian chain toy shop Città del Sole. In January and February of 2000, Geomag was shown at toy fairs in Milan, Nuremberg, and New York, with generally positive receptions. In the same year, due to the difference in views on the development of the products, the relationship between Vicentelli and Plastwood ended. 

This created the introduction of Geomag SA in January 2003, a Swiss company with its headquarters in Ticino, with the signing of an agreement between Vicentelli and Geomag SA allowing for the production of the patented construction toy line.  

At the end of July, Geomag SA began the production and marketing campaigns of the products, including the development of panel (triangular platforms, rhombi, squares, and pentagonal semi-transparent coloured polycarbonate, that can be used to fill gaps of the bars of the structure, with decorative function and support) which demonstrated a second success (representing 35% of the global market) and particularly became an important product line for Geomag as it differentiated the company from its imitators. This development is also a result of a patent licensed from Vicentelli.

In 2004 Vicentelli settles the trademark and patent related to a strategic game called magnetic challenge with the patent on the Geomag bars. Another patent on blocks from a product line that never entered the market, which acted as the supporting skeleton of the construction. In 2005 the G-Baby line was produced, consisting of cubes and half-spheres with magnetic faces, this line is targeted at early childhood children.

At the end of the year, Magnetix entered the market, with a similar product to Geomag.  A combination of this new competitor and the increase of magnetic toys (with the occurrence of accidents related to poor quality of Chinese-made products) created problems in the market and resulted in international regulations of quality (ASTM USA and the European Commission) to interest themselves in the sector, and in 2007 introduced a rule specifying that  if the dimension of the parts are small enough to fit in the test cylinder, the product can only be sold to children +14.

This new regulation resulted in the elongation of the bars to 58 mm compared to the original Geomag bars of 27 mm. The original Geomag is now called Geomag PRO and has a target of +14 and is not advertised as a toy.

Crisis and rebirth
Geomag SA took a severe hit in the competitive struggle as it was essentially a single-product company. It was affected by the lack of rules and the subsequent influx of advertising material and was forced to close in November 2007.
However, the market still showed strong potential (estimated at around 400 million dollars) whereby Geomag SA still remained the only company with a strong point of reference in the field.

2008 began the hunt for new potential partners, which would allow the group to recover quickly and implement the product strategies to the market that will prove to be successful. A group of entrepreneurs gave birth to a new society, Geomagworld SA.

2009 was the year of the definitive rebirth. Geomagworld SA started a process of partial re-industrialization and in April began the production of the 58 mm magnetic bar in order to comply with the European Standard EN71. The bar eventually formed the kids lines (aged +3), along with colour (bars and spheres) and panel (bars, spheres, and panels for reinforcement and a decorative effect ).

The original bar (27 mm), of which production still continues, became the new line pro consisting of pro colour, pro metal, and pro panel, and lost its image of being a toy and its rights to be offered to the public under 14 years of age. The line pro is still highly appreciated and consumed by the adult target market, thanks to its patented circuit and high performance as the bars are able to develop a magnetic attraction force equal to more than 200 times its own weight (4.5 grams). The G-Baby line maintained its characteristics as it is in line with all the new regulations.

In 2010, a pink line targeted at girls was introduced, and in 2011 a vehicle line wheels were released. The roly-poly products were added to the G-Baby line, animal characters that swing from the hemisphere platform.

In 2012, new colours were introduced: luminous glow, and in 2013 glitter, with small sparkly metallic inserts. The world line has cardboard panels with designs (house, castle, etc.) instead of the original plain panels. The e-motion line has additional specific accessories.

2013 saw the launch of KOR Geomag, similar to a three-dimensional puzzle consisting of a magnetic centre with sectors that attach through the magnetic force, allowing for the rotation and sliding around the core.

In 2014, the core technology platform KOR - is the heart of the spherical magnetic sectors that are attached to the central metal sphere, these are covered by plastic to form an egg - creating the KOR pure.

2014 saw the birth of mechanics, an extension of the Geomag Classic using elements of mechanics. 
These new plastic elements are fully compatible and integrated with classic bars and spheres allowing the construction of larger models, more solid structures, and the use of simpler construction methods.

The magnetic toy
In an interview with Claudio Vicentelli, he discusses how he started with a prototype of wood, and eventually developed his idea into a magnetic toy how it is known today (Geomag classic and PRO). 

The turning point in the evolution of the project, occurred when Vicentelli was in the finalization of the design of the object, deciding how to best achieve an optimal balance between magnetic attraction force and weight. This is when the original idea was abandoned, the original form of a "brick", and move to a new system of bars and spheres instead. 
The choice allowed for the maintenance of the highest ratio of magnetic force and weight cost of each unit, while also allowing for the possible development of the project and its subsequent marketing in a relatively short time.  

After the selection of the most efficient form, the next phase in the development of the toys was the research and the study of materials for the various components, in addition to choosing the most appropriate magnets. Complex calculations on the diameter of the bars and spheres allowed to obtain the coupling of two bars on the same sphere with angles less than 60 degrees, which is the necessary condition for the creation of triangular figures at the base of the game.

The choice of using plastic to cover the bars posed as a difficult task, however it allowed to lighten the individual units (with a thickness of a few tenth of a millimeter), while ensuring sufficient rigidity to support the three-dimensional shape of the figures once constructed. 

Another aspect of the project development that Vicentelli describes as being fundamentally important, is the protection of the components from oxidation and continuous rubbing. 
Once all of these solutions were put in place, Vicentelli concentrated on the optimization of the product. This was done by reducing the amount of plastic being used for the coatings, alongside the constant search for the increase of the ratio of strength/weight/cost while maintaining the same performance.

Similar toys
There are toy systems similar to Geomag, with slight dimensional differences. Making geometric forms that are consistent and stable usually requires components from a single source, due to the different lengths.

Similar toys:
 Magformers 
 Madmag
 Magic Joint
 Magmax
 Magnetix
 Magnext
 Magstix
 Magz
 Supermag†
 Xmag
†Supermag also has twist bars with screw ends and 2 sizes of spheres (10mm and 12.7mm) with screw holes. Until 2003 Supermag and Geomag were both produced by PlastWood. In 2003 PlastWood discontinued the Geomag line in favor of its own Supermag line. Geomag, holder of patents for their design, restarted production in Switzerland.

Some of the other toys have added features, such as bars of different or adjustable lengths, curved bars, or bars connecting to three or more spheres.

Awards 
 2002 Parents' Choice Award "Geomag"
 2004 Dr. TOy "The Best Advice on Children’s Products"  Geomag - Color - 44 pcs 
 2004 Gold Award Winners Nappa 
 2004 Parents' Choice Award "Geomag Color 96 Kit" 
 2004 Parents' Choice Award "Geomag Panel 125 Kit"
 2004 Toy Retailer Association "Construction Toy of the Year"
 2005 Oppenheim Toy Portfolio Best Toy Award Gold Seal 
 Parents' Choice Award "Geomag Pastelles 42"
 2005 Parents' Choice Award "Magnetic Challenge"
 2005 Tillywig Toy & Media Awards "G333 Glow Moon Explorer" 
 2005 TOTY "Special toy of the year" 
 2006 Parents' Choice Award "Geomag Dynamic Master"
 2006 Kids Superbrand 
 2012 Editors' Recommended Specialty Toy "GEOMAG E-Motion Power Spin 24 pc" 
 2012 Editors' Recommended Specialty Toy "Geomag Pink - 66 pc" 
 2012 Space Age Award in the category 'Little Scientists.'   "Geomag GLOW Moon Explorer" 
 2013 Editors' Recommended Specialty Toy "KOR Geomag - Aki"

References

External links 
 Official website
 Geomag Masters - Geomag Fan

Manufacturing companies established in 2009
Construction toys
Toy companies of Switzerland
Executive toys
2009 establishments in Switzerland